The Motorcycle Union of Ireland (MCUI) is the governing body of motorcycle sport in Ireland. The current President is Rebecca Hampshire.

The MCUI consists of three Bodies within the island of Ireland that are affiliated to the Fédération Internationale de Motocyclisme (International Motorcycling Federation). 

The three consituents which make up the Motor Cycle Union of Ireland are: Motorcycling Ireland (MCUI SC), the Motor Cycle Union of Ireland (Ulster Centre) and the Motorcycle Racing Association (MRA). 

The MCUI has jurisdiction in all questions relating to the sport of Tarmac and Trials motorcycling within Ireland.

Footnotes

External links
 

Motorcycle safety organizations
Motorcyclists organizations
Organisations based in Ireland
Sports governing bodies in Ireland
National members of the FIM